The Mercedes-Benz ConceptFASCINATION is a concept car created in Germany by Mercedes-Benz. It was revealed to the public on September 11, 2008, and appeared at the 2008 Paris Motor Show. The shooting-brake-style concept has been designed as a preview for the next-generation (W212) Mercedes E-Class. The concept was also a preview for the CLS-Class Shooting Brake.

Precursive design elements 
In German car-design circles, the term 'Fascination' is used to describe a 'new direction', with various elements such as the nose and profile likely to appear on the next-generation E-Class, to be revealed at the 2009 Geneva motor show, and its derivatives, including the CLS 4-door coupé.

Mercedes-Benz director Dr Thomas Weber, responsible for research and development said,

"The show car not only demonstrates a fascinating, new design idiom, but - with our new, high-performance and economical diesel drive system using BlueTEC technology - shows that Mercedes-Benz vehicles will also set standards in the future in terms of sustainability as well as emotional appeal, driving pleasure and comfort."

Specifications 
The ConceptFASCINATION is powered by a 2.2-litre four-cylinder BlueTec turbo-diesel engine, with emissions-cutting AdBlue technology. The engine develops 152kW of power and 500Nm of torque, and is combined with a 6-speed manual gearbox. This powertrain is likely to make production in various Mercedes-Benz models by 2010.

Detailed information regarding the ConceptFASCINATION will be revealed at the Paris motor show in October 2008.

References 

ConceptFASCINATION